Harry Clemens Ulrich Graf von Kessler (23 May 1868 – 30 November 1937) was an Anglo-German count, diplomat, writer, and patron of modern art. English translations of his diaries "Journey to the Abyss" (2011) and "Berlin in Lights" (1971) reveal anecdotes and details of artistic, theatrical, and political life in Europe, mostly in Germany, from the late 19th century through the collapse of Germany at the end of World War I until his death in Lyon in 1937.

Family

Harry Kessler's parents were the Hamburg banker Adolf Wilhelm Graf von Kessler (24 November 1838 – 22 January 1895) and Alice Harriet Blosse-Lynch (born 17 July 1844 in Bombay; died 19 September 1919 in Normandy), the daughter of Anglo-Irish Henry Blosse Lynch, C.B., of Partry House, County Mayo. Kessler's parents married in Paris on 10 August 1867; Kessler was born, also in Paris, in 1868. Kessler's younger sister was born in 1877, and was named Wilhelmina after Kaiser Wilhelm I, who became the child's godfather. After marriage, her name would become Wilma de Brion.

There were many rumours about a supposed affair between Kaiser Wilhelm I and Countess Alice Kessler. The swift rise of the Kessler family led to a legend that either Harry or his sister were the illegitimate offspring of the Emperor and Countess Alice Kessler, but Harry was born two years before his mother met the Emperor, and the Emperor was eighty years old when his sister Wilhelmina was born.

Adolf Wilhelm Kessler was ennobled in 1879 and again in 1881, Harry inheriting the titles on his father's death.

Life and work

Kessler grew up in France, England and Germany. Kessler was educated first in Paris and then, from 1880, in St. George's School, Ascot, an English boarding school. Following his father's wishes he enrolled in 1882 at the Gelehrtenschule des Johanneums in Hamburg, where he completed his Abitur (high-school education). Afterwards he joined the 3rd Garde-Ulanen regiment in Potsdam and earned the rank of an army officer. He studied law and art history in Bonn and Leipzig respectively. Kessler was familiar with many cultures, travelled widely, was active as a German diplomat, and came to be known as a man of the world and patron of the arts. He considered himself part of European society. His homosexuality, which inevitably made him a psychological outsider, undoubtedly influenced his insight and critique of Wilhelmian culture.

After moving to Berlin in 1893, he worked on the Art Nouveau journal PAN, which published literary work by, among others, Richard Dehmel, Theodor Fontane, Friedrich Nietzsche, Detlev von Liliencron, Julius Hart, Novalis, Paul Verlaine and Alfred Lichtwark. The short-lived journal also published graphic works by numerous artists including Henry van de Velde, Max Liebermann, Otto Eckmann and Ludwig von Hofmann.

On 24 March 1903, Kessler assumed control of the "Museum für Kunst und Kunstgewerbe" in Weimar. There he worked with new exhibition concepts and the establishment of a permanent arts and crafts exhibit.

In 1904, during his work in Weimar, Kessler began to publish a group of bibliophilic books containing artistic compositions of typography and illustrations. In the beginning he cooperated with the German Insel Verlag. In 1913 he founded his own company, the Cranach Press, of which he became the director.

Around 1909, Kessler developed a concept for a comic opera together with Hugo von Hofmannsthal and together they wrote the outline of the plot. Richard Strauss provided the music, and in 1911 Der Rosenkavalier premiered in Dresden under the baton of Ernst von Schuch.

Around 1913, Kessler commissioned Edward Gordon Craig, an English theatrical designer and theoretician, to make woodcut illustrations for a sumptuous edition of Shakespeare's Hamlet for the Cranach Press. A German translation by Gerhart Hauptmann, with illustrations by Craig, was finally published in Weimar in 1928. The English version, edited by J. Dover Wilson, came out in 1930. This book, printed on fine paper, using different type-faces, with marginal notes with source quotations, and featuring Craig's woodcuts, is regarded by many as one of the finest examples of the printer's art to have been published in the 20th century. It is still sought by collectors worldwide.

Kessler's ideas of reforming culture went beyond the visual arts. He developed a reformation concept for the theatre which was supported by Edward Gordon Craig, Max Reinhardt and Karl Vollmöller. Kessler asserted that a so-called "Mustertheater" should be established. The Belgian architect Henry van de Velde sought to design the corresponding building. On the initiative of Kessler, many prominent writers were invited to introduce a literary modernity to Weimar, but the hegemonic opinions were considered too conservative and nationalistic, and the plans for the Mustertheater failed.

During his Weimar period Kessler became close friends with Elisabeth Förster-Nietzsche (1846–1935), the sister of late Friedrich Nietzsche. At the suggestion of Kessler, she chose Weimar as domicile for the Nietzsche Archive.

In 1903, Kessler launched the Deutscher Künstlerbund and became its vice-president. The consortium supported less acknowledged artists including Edvard Munch, Johannes R. Becher, Detlev von Liliencron and the painters of Die Brücke. In 1906, an exhibition commotion gave reason to depose Kessler from his office. An exhibition of drawings at the Grand Ducal Museum by Rodin and dedicated, in error, to the Grand Duke of Sax Thuringia, was considered as a risk to the wives and daughters of Weimar. This was followed by a smear campaign that Kessler considered to be an intrigue by Aimé Charles Vincent von Palezieux, retired Prussian General and court Marshall in Weimar, but which led to Kessler's resignation. Palezieux died less than a year later on 10 February 1907 just before receipt of a challenge to a duel from Kessler.

Later years

Kessler saw active service on the Western Front during World War I. In 1918, he returned to his estate in Weimar, recording that although the house seemed unchanged from 1913 and his old servants and pets greeted him with affection, his collections of paintings, statues, books and mementos reflected a European intellectual and cultural community which was now "dead, missing, scattered .. or become enemies".

During World War I, Kessler and Karl Gustav Vollmoeller worked together at the German Embassy in Bern for the cultural department of the Foreign Office. They developed activities aimed at peace plans with France and England. In November 1918, Kessler was German Ambassador to Warsaw in the newly independent Poland (Second Polish Republic). In 1919, he wrote a "plan for a League of Nations on the basis of an organization of organizations (World Organisation)", which contains the constitution of such an international confederation of states. The purpose of this covenant was above all to prevent new wars, securing human rights and the regulation of world trade. Main body of this covenant would be the "World Council", which also elected an executive committee. Under his plan a Weltjustizhof, a World Court of Arbitration and administrative authorities would be built. This ordered by paragraphs plan had the form of a state constitution. Another plan for a supranational organisation he developed in 1920 as "Guidelines for a true League of Nations" in the form of a resolution. In 1922, he served for a short time as the President of the German Peace Society, of which he was a member from 1919 to 1929.

In the 1920s, Kessler as a journalist tried to influence the political debates of the Weimar Republic. He wrote essays on different social and foreign policy issues, such as socialism, or the League of Nations. He belonged to the left-liberal German Democratic Party (DDP) and wrote a biography of his 1922 murdered friend Walther Rathenau (then Foreign minister). In 1924, he was a DDP candidate for the Reichstag. When this attempt failed, he withdrew from politics. In the twenties, Kessler was frequently a guest at the Berlin SeSiSo Club. In 1932/33, material co-edited by him appeared in the magazine Das Freie Wort (The Free Word). After the Nazis' seizure of power in 1933, Kessler resigned and emigrated to Paris, then to Mallorca and finally to the southern French provinces. He died in 1937 in Lyon.

It was presumed that Kessler's earlier diaries had been lost but they were found in 1983 in a safe in Mallorca. In 2004, the first definitive nine volume edition was published in Germany and the first English edition of the 1880–1918 years was published in 2011.

References

Works

 Gesammelte Schriften in drei Bänden. Fischer, Frankfurt/M. 1988. 
 Vol 1: Gesichter und Zeiten.
 Vol 2: Notizen über Mexiko.
 Vol 3: Erinnerungen.
 Das Tagebuch 1880–1937. Klett-Cotta, Stuttgart 2004 ff.
Published:
Vol. 2: 1892–1897. 
Vol. 3: 1897–1905. 
Vol. 4: 1906–1914. 
Vol. 5: 1914–1916. 
Vol. 6: 1916–1918. 
Vol. 7: 1919–1923. 
Vol. 8: 1923–1926. 
Vol. 9: 1926–1937. 
 Walther Rathenau : Sein Leben und Werk, (1928).

Bibliography

  (in German)
 
  (in German)
 (text first published in 1971)
 (in German)

1868 births
1937 deaths
Writers from Paris
Counts of Germany
German Democratic Party politicians
Ambassadors of Germany to Poland
Ballet librettists
LGBT autobiographies
German book publishers (people)
German diarists
German emigrants to France
German male non-fiction writers
German Peace Society members
Reichsbanner Schwarz-Rot-Gold members
People educated at St. George's School, Ascot
People educated at the Gelehrtenschule des Johanneums
German Army personnel of World War I
German people of Irish descent
German people of English descent